Benjamin Burwell Johnston Jr. (March 15, 1926 – July 21, 2019) was an American contemporary music composer, known for his use of just intonation. He was called "one of the foremost composers of microtonal music" by Philip Bush and "one of the best non-famous composers this country has to offer" by John Rockwell.

Biography 
Johnston was born in Macon, Georgia, and taught composition and theory at the University of Illinois at Urbana–Champaign from 1951 to 1986, before retiring to North Carolina. During his time teaching, he was in contact with avant-garde figures such as John Cage, La Monte Young, and Iannis Xenakis. Johnston's students included Stuart Saunders Smith, Neely Bruce, Thomas Albert, Michael Pisaro, Manfred Stahnke, and Kyle Gann. He also considered his practice of just intonation to have influenced other composers, including Larry Polansky. In 1946 he married dance band singer Dorothy Haines, but they soon divorced. In 1950 he married artist Betty Hall, who died in 2007.

Johnston began as a traditional composer of art music before working with Harry Partch. He helped the senior musician to build instruments and use them in the performance and recording of new compositions. Partch then arranged for Johnston to study with Darius Milhaud at Mills College. In 1952, Johnston met Cage, who invited him to come to New York to study with him in the summer. Though Johnston decided he did not have sufficient time to prepare for such studies, he did go to New York for several weeks and assisted, along with Earle Brown, in the production of Cage's eight-track tape composition, Williams Mix.

Later, in 1957 and 1959, he studied with Cage, who encouraged him to follow his desires and use traditional instruments rather than electronics or newly built instruments. Unskilled in carpentry and finding electronics unreliable, Johnston struggled with how to integrate microtonality and conventional instruments for ten years. He also struggled with how to integrate microtones into his compositional language through a slow process of many stages. However, since 1960 Johnston had almost exclusively used a system of microtonal notation based on the rational intervals of just intonation, what Gann describes as a "lifelong allegiance" to microtonality. Johnston also studied with Burrill Phillips and Robert Palmer.

Johnston composed music for multiple productions by the E.T.C. Company of La MaMa, Wilford Leach and John Braswell's company-in-residence at La MaMa Experimental Theatre Club in the East Village of Manhattan. His most significant work was Carmilla, which the company performed as part of their repertory throughout the 1970s. He also composed music for the company's production of Gertrude, a musical about the life of Gertrude Stein.

His other works included the orchestral work Quintet for Groups (commissioned by the St. Louis Symphony Orchestra), Sonnets of Desolation (commissioned by the Swingle Singers), the Sonata for Microtonal Piano (1964), and the Suite for Microtonal Piano (1977). Johnston completed ten string quartets. The Kepler Quartet recorded all ten of his string quartets for New World Records, finishing in April 2016 just after the composer's 90th birthday.

Johnston said:
He received many honors, including a Guggenheim Fellowship in 1959, a grant from the National Council on the Arts and the Humanities in 1966, two commissions from the Smithsonian Institution, and the Deems Taylor Award. In 2007, the American Academy of Arts and Letters honored Johnston for his lifetime of work. His Quintet for Groups won the SWR Sinfonieorchester prize at the 2008 Donaueschinger Musiktage.

Heidi Von Gunden wrote a monograph on the composer, and Bob Gilmore edited the composer's complete writings, which were published as "Maximum Clarity" and Other Writings on Music by the University of Illinois Press. A three-part oral history covering all stages of his career is housed at the Oral History of American Music through Yale University.

Johnston died from complications of Parkinson's disease in Deerfield, Wisconsin, on July 21, 2019.

Music 
He is best known for extending Harry Partch's experiments in just intonation tuning to traditional instruments through his system of notation.

Johnston's compositional style was eclectic. He used serial processes, folk song idioms (string quartets 4, 5, and 10), repetitive processes, traditional forms like fugue and variations, and intuitive processes. His main goal was "to reestablish just intonation as a viable part of our musical tradition." According to Mark Swed, "ultimately, what Johnston has done, more than any other composer with roots in the great American musical experiments of the '50s and '60s, is to translate those radical approaches to the nature of music into a music that is immediately apprehensible".

Most of Johnston's later works use a large number of pitches, generated through just-intonation procedures. In these works he formed melodies based on an "otonal" eight-note just-intonation scale made from the 8th through 15th partials of the harmonic series, or its "utonal" inversion. He then gained new pitches by using common-tone transpositions or inversions. Many of his works also feature an expansive use of just intonation, using high prime limits. His String Quartet No. 9 uses intervals of the harmonic series as high as the 31st partial. He used "potentially hundreds of pitches per octave," in a way that was "radical without being avant-garde"; in contrast with much twentieth-century music, he used microtones not for the creation of dissonance but in order to "return […] to a kind of musical beauty," which he perceived as diminished in Western music since the adoption of equal-temperament. "By the beginning of the 1980s he could say of his elaborately microtonal String Quartet no. 5... 'I have no idea as to how many different pitches it used per octave'".

Johnston's early efforts in just composition drew heavily on the accomplishments of post-Webern serialism. His 7-limit String Quartet no. 4 "Amazing Grace", was commissioned by the Fine Arts Music Foundation of Chicago, and was first recorded by the Fine Arts Quartet on Nonesuch Records in 1980 (then reissued on Gasparo as GS205). His String Quartet no. 4, perhaps Johnston's best-known composition, has also been recorded by the Kronos Quartet. The Kepler Quartet (Sharan Leventhal, Eric Segnitz, Brek Renzelman, and Karl Lavine) also recorded the piece for New World Records, as part of a complete 10-quartet series documenting Johnston's entire cycle of string quartets. The Third Quartet was premiered as part of this series by the Concord String Quartet at Alice Tully Hall at Lincoln Center for the Performing Arts, on March 15, 1976, the composer's fiftieth birthday.

Staff notation

Beginning in the 1960s, Johnston proposed an approach to notating music in just intonation (JI), redefining the understanding of conventional symbols (the seven "white" notes, along with the sharps and flats) and adding further accidentals, each designed to extend the notation into higher prime limits. Johnston‘s method is based on a diatonic C major scale tuned in JI, in which the interval between D (9/8 above C) and A (5/3 above C) is one Syntonic comma less than a Pythagorean perfect fifth 3:2. To write a perfect fifth, Johnston introduces a pair of symbols representing this comma, + and –. Thus, a series of perfect fifths beginning with F would proceed C G D A+ E+ B+. The three conventional white notes A E B are tuned as Ptolemaic major thirds (5:4, Ptolemy's intense diatonic scale) above F C G respectively. Johnston introduces new symbols for the septimal ( & ), undecimal ( & ), tridecimal ( & ), and further prime extensions to create an accidental-based exact JI notation for what he has named "extended just intonation".

Though "this notation is not tied to any particular diapason" and the ratios between pitches remain constant, most of Johnson’s works used A = 440 as the tuning note, making C 264 hertz. In Johnson’s notation a string quartet is tuned C–, G–, D–, A, E.

Recordings
 2016: Ben Johnston: String Quartets Nos. 7, 8 & 6, Quietness – Kepler Quartet (New World Records CD-80730)
 String Quartet No. 7
 String Quartet No. 8
 String Quartet No. 6
"Quietness" (string quartet and voice)
 2014: Ben Johnston: Ruminations – Eclipse String Quartet, John Schneider (voice, microtonal guitar), Karen Clark (voice), Jim Sullivan (clarinet), Sarah Thornblade (violin) (MicroFest Records CD-5)
"The Tavern"
"Revised Standards"
"Parable"
 2011: Ben Johnston: String Quartets Nos. 1, 5 & 10 – Kepler Quartet (New World Records CD-80693)
 String Quartet No. 5
 String Quartet No. 10
 String Quartet No. 1, "Nine Variations"
 2008: On Track: Commissions Vol. 2. – New Century Saxophone Quartet (Alanna Records ACD-6006, Pittsburgh)
 Includes Johnston's "O Waly Waly Variations"
 2006: Ben Johnston: String Quartets Nos. 2, 3, 4 & 9 – Kepler Quartet (New World Records CD-80637)
 String Quartet No. 9
Crossings: String Quartet No. 3
Crossings: The Silence
Crossings: String Quartet No. 4, "Amazing Grace"
 String Quartet No. 2
 2005: Susan Fancher: Ponder Nothing (Innova Records)
 Includes Johnston's "Ponder Nothing"
 2002: Cleveland Chamber Symphony. Vol. 1, 2 & 3 (Troppe Note Records)
 Includes Johnston's "Songs of Loss"
 1997: Phillip Bush: Microtonal Piano (Koch International Classics 3-7369-2-H1)
 Includes Johnston's Suite for Microtonal Piano
 Includes Johnston's Sonata for Microtonal Piano
 Includes Johnston's "Saint Joan"
 1996: Michael Cameron: Progression (Ziva Records)
 Includes Johnston's "Progression"
 1993: Ponder Nothing: Chamber Music of Ben Johnston (New World Records 80432-2)
 Septet for woodwinds, horn, and strings
"Three Chinese Lyrics"
"Gambit:"
"Five Fragments"
 Trio
"Ponder Nothing"
 1995: The Stanford Quartet (Laurel Records)
 Includes Johnston's String Quartet No. 9
 1976: Sound Forms for Piano (LP record, New World Records NW-203)
 Includes Johnston's Sonata for Microtonal Piano
 1995: The Kronos Quartet: Released (compilation, Nonesuch Records)
 Includes Johnston's String Quartet No. 4, "Amazing Grace"
 1993: Urban Diva – Dora Ohrenstein (soprano), Mary Rowell (violin), Phillip Bush (keyboards), Bill Ruyle and Jason Cirker (percussion), John Thompson (electric bass) (Emergency Music, Composers Recordings Incorporated CD-654)
 Includes Johnston's "Calamity Jane to Her Daughter"
 1987: White Man Sleeps – Kronos Quartet (Elektra/Nonesuch 79163-2)
 Includes Johnston's String Quartet No. 4, "Amazing Grace"
 1984: New Swingle Singers and New Vocal Workshop (Composers Recordings, Inc.)
Includes Johnston's "Sonnets of Desolation"
Includes Johnston's "Visions and Spels"
 1983: The New World Quartet (Composers Recordings, Inc.)
 Includes Johnston's String Quartet No. 6
 1980: The Fine Arts Quartet (Nonesuch Records)
 Includes Johnston's String Quartet No. 4, "Amazing Grace"
 1979: Music from the University of Illinois (Composers Recordings, Inc.)
 Includes Johnston's Duo for flute and contrabass
 1970: Carmilla: A Vampire Tale (Vanguard Records)
 1969: John Cage & Lejaren Hiller – HPSCHD/ Ben Johnston – String Quartet No. 2. (LP record, Nonesuch Records H-71224)
 1969: The Contemporary Contrabass - Bertram Turetzky, contrabass (LP record, Nonesuch Records H-71237)
 Includes Johnston's "Casta*"
 1968: New Music Choral Ensemble – Kenneth Gaburo, conductor (LP record, Ars Nova/Ars Antiqua Records AN1005)
 Includes Johnston's "Ci-Git Satie"

Footnotes

References

Further reading 
Elster, Steven. 1991. "A Harmonic and Serial Analysis of Ben Johnston's String Quartet No. 6". Perspectives of New Music 29, no. 2 (Summer): 138–165.
Gilmore, Bob. 1995. "Changing the Metaphor: Ratio Models of Musical Pitch in the Work of Harry Partch, Ben Johnston, and James Tenney". Perspectives of New Music 33, nos. 1–2 (Winter-Summer): 458–503.
Johnson, Timothy Ernest. 2008. "13-limit Extended Just Intonation in Ben Johnston's String Quartet Number 7 and Toby Twining's Chrysalid Requiem, Gradual/Tract". Doctor of Musical Arts thesis. Urbana: University of Illinois at Urbana-Champaign.
Johnston, Ben, and Sylvia Smith. 2006. Who Am I? Why Am I Here?: Ben Johnston Reflects on his Life in Music. Baltimore: Smith Publications.
Johnston, Sibyl. 2007. "Very Precise Relationships: Two Interviews with Ben Johnston". American Music 25, no. 2 (Summer): 169–192.
Kassel, Richard. 2001. "Johnston, Ben(jamin Burwell)". The New Grove Dictionary of Music and Musicians, second edition, edited by Stanley Sadie and John Tyrrell. London: Macmillan Publishers.
Maltz, Richard Steven. 1991. "Microtonal Techniques in Charles Ives' Three Quarter-Tone Pieces for Two Pianos, Harry Patch's And [on] the Seventh Day Petals Fell in Petaluma, and Ben Johnston's Fourth String Quartet". PhD thesis. University of South Carolina.
Ratliff, Phillip. 2002. "How Sweet the Sound". Living Music 18, no. 1 (Fall): 8–9.
Schneider, John (ed.) 2007. "Ben Johnston at Eighty". 1/1: The Journal of the Just Intonation Network 12, no. 3 (Johnston birthday volume).
Shinn, Randall. 1977. "Ben Johnston's Fourth String Quartet". Perspectives of New Music 15, no. 2 (Spring-Summer): 145–173.
Stahnke, Manfred. 2015. "Ben Johnston: Microtonal Piano Sonata. Klavierstimmung als Fessel und Freiheit – Anmerkungen zu Ben Johnstons Sonata for Microtonal Piano". MusikTexte 144, (February): 87-.
 Taylor, Mark R. 2002. "Ben Johnston: Suite; Sonata; Saint Joan. Phillip Bush (piano); Koch International Classics 3-7369-2-H1; Ben Johnston: Chamber Music. Music Amici. New World Records 80432-2". Tempo, new series, no. 220 (April): 54–55. (accessed 1 April 2009.)
 Zimmerman, Walter. 2020. Desert Plants – Conversations with 23 American Musicians, Berlin: Beginner Press in cooperation with Mode Records (originally published in 1976 by A.R.C., Vancouver). The 2020 edition includes a cd featuring the original interview recordings with Larry Austin, Robert Ashley, Jim Burton, John Cage, Philip Corner, Morton Feldman, Philip Glass, Joan La Barbara, Garrett List, Alvin Lucier, John McGuire, Charles Morrow, J.B. Floyd (on Conlon Nancarrow), Pauline Oliveros, Charlemagne Palestine, Ben Johnston (on Harry Partch), Steve Reich, David Rosenboom, Frederic Rzewski, Richard Teitelbaum, James Tenney, Christian Wolff, and La Monte Young.

External links
Ben Johnston at Plainsound Music Edition
"Ben Johnston" on the Living Composers Project
"A New Dissonance" : video interviews with Johnston, blog entries, documentary footage of rehearsals of String Quartet No. 10 by the Kepler Quartet
Ben Johnston at UNC (Greensboro) symposium : autobiographical lecture describing his early music influences and his interest in microtonal music and just intonation
Interview with Ben Johnston (April 7, 1987)
Johnston's page on La MaMa Archives Digital Collections

Listening
Casta Bertram, Bertram Turetzky (NonesuchRecords, 1969) FLAC and liner notes MP3
String Quartet No. 2, Composers Quartet (Nonesuch, 1969) FLAC and liner notes MP3
String Quartet no. 6, New World Quartet (Composers Recordings Inc., 1983) liner notes MP3: click on "Johnston 01.mp3"
Sonnets of Desolation, New Swingle Singers and New Vocal Workshop (Composers Recordings Inc., 1984) liner notes MP3: click on "Johnston 02.mp3"
Visions and Spels, New Swingle Singers and New Vocal Workshop (Composers Recordings Inc., 1984) liner notes MP3: click on "Johnston 03.mp3" for part 1; click on "Johnston 04.mp3" for part 2

1926 births
2019 deaths
20th-century classical composers
21st-century classical composers
American male classical composers
American classical composers
Microtonal composers
Modernist composers
Twelve-tone and serial composers
Just intonation composers
Writers from Macon, Georgia
Musicians from Macon, Georgia
Mills College alumni
University of Illinois Urbana-Champaign faculty
Pupils of Robert Moffat Palmer
Pupils of Darius Milhaud
Pupils of Harry Partch
21st-century American composers
Experimental Music Studios alumni
20th-century American composers
Deaths from Parkinson's disease
Neurological disease deaths in Wisconsin
Members of the American Academy of Arts and Letters